Ořechov may refer to places in the Czech Republic:

Ořechov (Brno-Country District), a municipality and village in the South Moravian Region
Ořechov (Jihlava District), a municipality and village in the Vysočina Region
Ořechov (Uherské Hradiště District), a municipality and village in the Zlín Region
Ořechov (Žďár nad Sázavou District), a municipality and village in the Vysočina Region
Velký Ořechov, a municipality and village in the Zlín Region

See also
Orzechów (disambiguation)